Chuck McKinley defeated Fred Stolle 9–7, 6–1, 6–4 in the final to win the gentlemen's singles tennis title at the 1963 Wimbledon Championships. Rod Laver was the defending champion, but was ineligible to compete after turning professional.

Seeds

  Roy Emerson (quarterfinals)
  Manuel Santana (semifinals)
  Ken Fletcher (second round)
  Chuck McKinley (champion)
  Martin Mulligan (fourth round)
  Pierre Darmon (second round)
  Jan-Erik Lundqvist (fourth round)
  Mike Sangster (first round)

Draw

Finals

Top half

Section 1

Section 2

Section 3

Section 4

Bottom half

Section 5

Section 6

Section 7

Section 8

References

External links

Men's Singles
Wimbledon Championship by year – Men's singles